William Miller was the Chief Cashier of the Bank of England from 1864 to 1866. Miller was replaced as Chief Cashier by George Forbes.

References

Chief Cashiers of the Bank of England
Year of birth missing
Year of death missing